Pogiso Sanoka (born 4 June 1992) is a South African soccer player who plays as a defender for South African Premier Division side TS Galaxy.

Club career
Having previously played for Orbit College in the SAFA Second Division, Sanoka joined Maritzburg United in 2015 after a trial spell.

References

1992 births
Living people
South African soccer players
Association football defenders
Maritzburg United F.C. players
TS Galaxy F.C. players
South African Premier Division players